Phtheochroa rugosana is a small moth of the family Tortricidae.

It is found in western Europe (Iberian Peninsula, France and the British Isles) east to the Benelux, Switzerland and Italy, and further across the Balkans and Hungary to Asia Minor and Armenia. It also occurs in the Maghreb (possibly excluding Tunisia) and on the Canary Islands. 

The wingspan is 18–23 mm. Adults are on wing from May to July. There is one generation per year.

The caterpillars feed on red bryony (Bryonia dioica) and probably also squirting cucumber (Ecballium elaterium). More unusually, they have been recorded eating rotting wood.

Synonyms
Obsolete scientific names for this species are:
 Tortrix rugosana Hübner, [1799]
 Commophila rugosana (Hübner, [1799])
 Phalaena v-albana Donovan, 1806
 Phalonia albana Kennel, 1913

Footnotes

References
  (2009): Online World Catalogue of the Tortricidae – Phtheochroa rugosana. Version 1.3.1. Retrieved 2009-APR-15.
  (1942): Eigenartige Geschmacksrichtungen bei Kleinschmetterlingsraupen ["Strange tastes among micromoth caterpillars"]. Zeitschrift des Wiener Entomologen-Vereins 27: 105-109 [in German]. PDF fulltext
  (2003): Markku Savela's Lepidoptera and some other life forms – Phtheochroa rugosana. Version of 2003-JAN-19. Retrieved 2010-APR-15.

External links
Phtheochroa rugosana on UKMoths
Phtheochroa rugosana on microlepidoptera.nl
Phtheochroa rugosana on Lepidoptera of Belgium

Phtheochroa
Moths described in 1799
Tortricidae of Europe